Aegomorphus homonymus is a species of beetle in the family Cerambycidae. It was described by Aurivillius in 1924, and renamed by Blackwelder in 1946.

References

Aegomorphus
Beetles described in 1924